The JMC Yuhu (江铃域虎) is a mid-size pickup truck produced by Jiangling Motors for the Chinese market. The model was also sold as the second generation Boarding or Baodian (宝典）in several markets and is also the successor of the JMC Baodian. The Yuhu later spawned a few variants that was sold alongside each other including the regular Baodian, the Yuhu 3 and Yuhu 5.

Overview

The JMC Yuhu pickup shares similar exterior design elements with the Ford Ranger and Mazda BT-50, but it is built on Jiangling's own platform.

During the 2015 Shanghai Motor Show, Jiangling Motors showed off an off-road coupé utility concept version of the pickup with cooperation with Ford.

Jiangling entered the Australian market in 2016, and the truck is the first model sold under the name JMC Vigus.
Jiangling left the Australian market in 2018 due to poor sales of the Vigus.

JMC Baodian
The updated Yuhu-based Baodian is an entry level model of the Yuhu range and is aimed to replace the aging Baodian pickup. The model offers a selection of rear wheel drive and four wheel drive models with engine options of a 2.5 liter diesel turbo engine and a 1.8 liter petrol turbo engine. There are up to 16 trim levels available.

JMC Yuhu 3 and Yuhu 5
The Yuhu 3 and Yuhu 5 are variants of the JMC Yuhu positioned under the more up market Yuhu 7 pickup. The Yuhu 3 and Yuhu 5 feature slightly different front bumper designs and are priced differently. The Yuhu 3 offer a selection of rear wheel drive and four wheel drive models with engine options of a 2.5 liter diesel turbo engine and a 1.8 liter petrol turbo engine, while the Yuhu 5 offer a selection of rear wheel drive and four wheel drive models with engine options of a 2.4 liter diesel turbo engine and a 2.0 liter diesel turbo engine.

References

External links
Official JMC Yuhu website 
Jiangling Motors Corporation Group website

Trucks of China
Pickup trucks
All-wheel-drive vehicles
Rear-wheel-drive vehicles